Gloucestershire County Cricket Club is one of eighteen first-class county clubs within the domestic cricket structure of England and Wales. It represents the historic county of Gloucestershire. Founded in 1870, Gloucestershire have always been first-class and have played in every top-level domestic cricket competition in England. The club played its first senior match in 1870 and W. G. Grace was their captain. The club plays home games at the Bristol County Ground in the Bishopston area of north Bristol. A number of games are also played at the Cheltenham Cricket Festival at the College Ground, Cheltenham and matches have also been played at the Gloucester cricket festival at The King's School, Gloucester.

Gloucestershire's most famous players have been W. G. Grace, whose father founded the club, and Wally Hammond, who scored 113 centuries for them. The club has had two notable periods of success: in the 1870s when it was unofficially acclaimed as the Champion County on at least three occasions, and from 1999 to 2006 when it won seven limited overs trophies, notably a ‘double double’ in 1999 and 2000 (both the Benson and Hedges Cup and the C&G Trophy in both seasons), and the Sunday League in 2000.

Honours

First XI honours
 Champion County (3) – 1874, 1876, 1877, shared (1) – 1873
 County Championship (0)
Runners-up (6): 1930, 1931, 1947, 1959, 1969, 1986
 Royal London One-Day Cup (1) – 2015
 Sunday/National League/Pro40 (1) – 2000
Runners-up (2): 1988, 2003
Division Two (2): 2002, 2006
 Gillette/NatWest/C&G Trophy (5) – 1973, 1999, 2000, 2003, 2004,
Semi-finalists (5): 1968, 1971, 1975, 1987, 2009
 Benson & Hedges Cup (3) – 1977, 1999, 2000
Finalists (1): 2001
Semi-finalists (1): 1972
 Twenty20 Cup -
Finalists (1): 2007
Semi-finalists (1): 2003, 2020

Second XI honours
 Second XI Championship (1) – 1959

Earliest cricket
Cricket probably reached Gloucestershire by the end of the 17th century.  It is known that the related sport of "Stow-Ball" aka "Stob-Ball" was played in the county during the 16th century. In this game, the bat was called a "stave".  See Alice B Gomme : The Traditional Games of England, Scotland and Ireland.

A game in Gloucester on 22 September 1729 is the earliest definite reference to cricket in the county.  From then until the founding of the county club, very little has been found outside parish cricket.

Origin of club
In the early 1840s, Dr Henry Grace and his brother-in-law Alfred Pocock founded the Mangotsfield Cricket Club which merged in 1846 with the West Gloucestershire Cricket Club, whose name was adopted until 1867, after which it became the Gloucestershire County Cricket Club. Grace hoped that Gloucestershire would join the first-class county clubs but the situation was complicated in 1863 by the formation of a rival club called the Cheltenham and Gloucestershire Cricket Club.

Dr Grace's club played Gloucestershire's initial first-class match versus Surrey at Durdham Down in Bristol on 2, 3 & 4 June 1870.  Gloucestershire joined the (unofficial) County Championship at this time but the existence of the Cheltenham club seems to have forestalled the installation of its "constitutional trappings".  The Cheltenham club was wound up in March 1871 and its chief officials accepted positions in the hierarchy of Gloucestershire.  So, although the exact details and dates of the county club's foundation are uncertain, it has always been assumed that the year was 1870 and the club celebrated its centenary in 1970.

What is certain is that Dr Grace was able to form the county club because of its playing strength, especially his three sons WG, EM and Fred.

Club history

The early history of Gloucestershire is dominated by the Grace family, most notably W G Grace, who was the club's original captain and held that post until his departure for London in 1899.  His brother E M Grace, although still an active player, was the original club secretary.  With the Grace brothers and Billy Midwinter in their team, Gloucestershire won three Champion County titles in the 1870s.

Since then Gloucestershire's fortunes have been mixed and they have never won the official County Championship. They struggled in the pre-war years of the County Championship because their best batsmen, apart from Gilbert Jessop and briefly Charlie Townsend, were very rarely available. The bowling, except when Townsend did sensational things on sticky wickets in late 1895 and late 1898, was very weak until George Dennett emerged – then it had the fault of depending far too much on him. Wally Hammond, who still holds many of the county's batting records formed part of an occasionally strong inter-war team, although the highest championship finish during this period was second in 1930 and 1931, when Charlie Parker and Tom Goddard formed a devastating spin attack.

Outstanding players since the war include Tom Graveney, "Jack" Russell and overseas players Mike Procter, Zaheer Abbas and Courtney Walsh.

Dominance in one-day cricket (1999–2004)
Gloucestershire was very successful in one-day cricket in the late 1990s and early 2000s winning several titles under the captaincy of Mark Alleyne and coaching of John Bracewell. The club operated on a small budget and was famed as a team greater than the sum of its parts, boasting few international stars. Gloucestershire's overall knockout record between 1999 and 2002 was 28 wins and seven losses from 37 games, including 16 wins from 18 at the Bristol County Ground.

The club's run of success started by defeating Yorkshire to win the Benson & Hedges Super Cup in 1999 before then beating neighbours Somerset in the 1999 NatWest Trophy final at Lord's. In 2000 Gloucestershire completed a hat-trick of one-day titles, winning all the domestic limited overs tournaments, the Benson and Hedges Cup, the C&G Trophy and the Sunday League in the same season. The club maintained its success winning the C&G Trophy in 2003 and 2004, beating Worcestershire in the final on both occasions.

Recent years (2006–present)
The club's captain for the 2006 season, Jon Lewis, became the first Gloucestershire player for nearly 10 years to play for England at Test match level, when he was picked to represent his country in the Third Test against Sri Lanka at Trent Bridge in June 2006. His figures in the first innings were 3–68, including a wicket in his very first over in Test cricket, and he was widely praised for his debut performance.

Following the retirement of several key players, such as "Jack" Russell and Mark Alleyne, Gloucestershire's fortunes declined. The club subsequently stripped back its playing budget as it looked to finance the redevelopment of the Bristol County Ground in order to maintain Category B status and secure future international games at their home ground. Performances suffered and despite reaching the final of the 2007 Twenty20 Cup, losing narrowly to Kent, the club failed to win any major trophies for a decade.

In 2013 Gloucestershire stopped using 'Gloucestershire Gladiators' as its limited-overs name.

Gloucestershire won their first major silverware for 11 years in 2015, overcoming favoured Surrey to win the Royal London One-Day Cup in the final at Lord's. Captain Michael Klinger, who flew back from Australia to play in the semi-final win over Yorkshire, was named the tournament's MVP scoring 531 runs at an average of over 106.

Rivalries
Gloucestershire contest one of English cricket's fiercest rivalries, the West Country derby against Somerset, which usually draws the biggest crowd of the season for either team. Traditionally, the boundary between the counties is drawn by the River Avon. Although Gloucestershire CCC's home ground is in Bristol, which straddles the Avon (and has been a county in its own right since 1373), many people from south Bristol favour Somerset CCC despite the fact the club plays its home games much further away in Taunton. However, in the past Somerset have played first-class matches at venues in the south of Bristol.

Grounds

The club's debut home match in first-class cricket was played at Durdham Down in the Clifton district of Bristol.  This was the only time the county used this venue for a match.  The following year Gloucestershire began to play matches at the Clifton College Close Ground in the grounds of Clifton College in the same part of the city, and this remained a regular venue for the county until the 1930s, hosting nearly 100 first-class matches.  In 1872 the county used a venue outside Bristol for the first time when they played at the College Ground in the grounds of Cheltenham College.  This venue has continued to be used regularly for the county's annual "Cheltenham festival" event, which in the modern era incorporates additional charity events and off-field entertainment.  In 1889 Gloucestershire began to play matches at the Bristol County Ground in Bristol, which has subsequently served as the club's main headquarters and hosted the majority of the county's matches.  It was here that the club played its first List A match in 1963 against Middlesex, and its first Twenty20 match forty years later against Worcestershire.  Somerset have played first-class matches at other venues in the city.

In the 1920s Gloucestershire ceased playing at the Spa Ground in Gloucester, which had been in use since 1882, and switched to the Wagon Works Ground in the city.  This ground remained in use for nearly 70 years, hosting over 150 first-class matches, before its use was discontinued in 1992.  In 2012 the club investigated the possibility of returning to the Wagon Works Ground and making it their permanent headquarters after being refused permission for extensive redevelopment of the County Ground in Bristol, but ultimately this did not occur.  In 1993, the club moved its base in Gloucester to Archdeacon Meadow, a ground owned by The King's School.  This venue was only used for first-class matches until 2008 but was used for four Twenty20 matches in 2010 and 2011, the most recent county games to take place in the city.  All subsequent matches have taken place in either Bristol or Cheltenham.

Players

Current squad
 No. denotes the player's squad number, as worn on the back of their shirt.
  denotes players with international caps.

Source: Cricinfo

International players

Among the international players who have represented Gloucestershire are:

 W G Grace
 E M Grace
 Fred Grace
 Billy Midwinter
 Gilbert Jessop
 Charlie Parker
 Wally Hammond
 Tom Goddard
 Sam Cook
 Tom Graveney
 Arthur Milton
 Mike Procter
 Zaheer Abbas
 Sadiq Mohammad
 Courtney Walsh
 David Lawrence
 Jack Russell
 Javagal Srinath
 Malinga Bandara
 Marcus North
 Aaron Redmond
 Ian Butler
 Hamish Marshall
 James Franklin
 Kane Williamson
 Rob Nicol
 Muttiah Muralitharan
 Ed Cowan
 Dan Christian
 Cameron Bancroft
 Michael Klinger
 Andrew Tye
 Peter Handscomb
 Mark Craig
 Cheteshwar Pujara
 Kevin Curran

Club captains

 WG Grace 1870–1898(Longest Serving Captain)
 WG Grace, W Troup 1899
 GL Jessop 1900–1912
 COH Sewell 1913–1914
 Sir FG Robinson 1919–1921
 PFC Williams 1922–1923
 DC Robinson : 1924–1926
 WH Rowlands 1927–1928
 BH Lyon 1929–1934
 DAC Page 1935–1936
 BO Allen 1937–1938
 WR Hammond 1939–1946
 BO Allen 1947–1950
 Sir DTL Bailey 1951–1952
 JF Crapp 1953–1954
 GM Emmett 1955–1958
 TW Graveney 1959–1960
 CTM Pugh 1961–1962
 JKR Graveney 1963–1964
 JB Mortimore 1965–1967
 CA Milton 1968
 AS Brown 1969–1976
 MJ Procter 1977–1981
 DA Graveney 1982–1988
 CWJ Athey 1989
 AJ Wright 1990–1992
 AJ Wright, CA Walsh 1993
 CA Walsh 1994
 RC Russell 1995
 CA Walsh 1996
 MW Alleyne 1997–2003
 CG Taylor 2004–2005
 J Lewis 2006–2008
 APR Gidman 2009–2012
 M Klinger 2013–2014
 GO Jones 2015
 GH Roderick 2016-2017
 CDJ Dent 2018-2021
 GL van Buuren 2022 to date

Records

Most first-class runs for Gloucestershire 
Qualification – 20,000 runs 

Most first-class wickets for Gloucestershire 
Qualification – 1,000 wickets 

Team totals

 Highest total for – 695–9 declared v. Middlesex, Archdeacon Meadow, Gloucester, 2004
 Highest total against – 774–7 declared by the Australians, Bristol, 1948
 Lowest total for – 17 v. the Australians, Cheltenham (Spa), 22 August 1896
 Lowest total against – 12 by Northamptonshire, Gloucester, 1907

Batting

 Highest score – 341 Craig Spearman v. Middlesex, Gloucester, 2004
 Most runs in season – 2,860 W. R. Hammond, 1933
 Most hundreds in career – 113 W. R. Hammond, 1920–1951

Best partnership for each wicket

 1st – 395 D. M. Young & R. B. Nicholls v. Oxford University, Oxford, 1962
 2nd – 256 C. T. M. Pugh & T. W. Graveney v. Derbyshire, Chesterfield, 1960
 3rd – 392 A. P. R. Gidman & G. H. Roderick v. Leicestershire, Bristol, 2014
 4th – 321 W. R. Hammond & W. L. Neale v. Leicestershire, Gloucester, 1937
 5th – 261 W. G. Grace & WO Moberly v. Yorkshire, Cheltenham, 1876
 6th – 320 G. L. Jessop & J. H. Board v. Sussex, Hove, 1903
 7th – 248 W. G. Grace & E. L. Thomas v. Sussex, Hove, 1896
 8th – 239 W. R. Hammond & A. E. Wilson v. Lancashire, Bristol, 1938
 9th – 193 W. G. Grace & S. A. P. Kitcat v. Sussex, Bristol, 1896
 10th – 137 L. C. Norwell & C. N. Miles v. Worcestershire, Cheltenham, 2014

Bowling

 Best bowling – 10–40 E. G. Dennett v. Essex, Bristol, 1906
 Best match bowling – 17–56 C. W. L. Parker v. Essex, Gloucester, 1925
 Wickets in season – 222 T. W. J. Goddard, 1937 and 1947

Shirt sponsors
One-day / T20 cricket

See also 
 GCCC in 2004
 GCCC in 2005
 GCCC in 2006

References

Bibliography
 H S Altham, A History of Cricket, Volume 1 (to 1914), George Allen & Unwin, 1962
 Derek Birley, A Social History of English Cricket, Aurum, 1999
 Rowland Bowen, Cricket: A History of its Growth and Development, Eyre & Spottiswoode, 1970
 Simon Rae, W G Grace, Faber & Faber, 1998
 J R Webber, The Chronicle Of W.G., The Association Of Cricket Statisticians and Historians, 1998
 Roy Webber, The Playfair Book of Cricket Records, Playfair Books, 1951
 Playfair Cricket Annual – various editions
 Wisden Cricketers' Almanack – various editions

External links

 Gloucestershire County Cricket Club
 BBC match reports, interviews and streaming commentary

 
Cricket clubs established in 1870
English first-class cricket teams
Cricket in Bristol

Cricket in Gloucestershire
History of Gloucestershire
1870 establishments in England